The 1961 Claxton Shield was the 22nd annual Claxton Shield, it was held at Norwood Oval in Adelaide, South Australia. The participants were South Australia, New South Wales, Victoria, Western Australia and Queensland. The series was won by the home team South Australia, claiming their seventh and third consecutive Shield title.

References

1961 in baseball
1961 in Australian sport
1961
July 1961 sports events in Australia
August 1961 sports events in Australia